Jesus Green Swimming Pool is a lido situated on Jesus Green in Cambridge, England. Opened in 1923, it is one of the few remaining examples of the lidos built across the country in the 1920s — open air pools with space for activities other than swimming. Unusually, the pool is significantly longer than it is wide — this was a design idea to mimic swimming in the nearby river. It opens for public bathing every day from May to September each year, and remains open but operates reduced hours over the winter period.

Diving is allowed into the centre section of the pool. The pool has a dedicated swimming lane for 'fast' swimmers the remaining two-thirds is for recreational swimming.

The pool is unheated. The Friends of Jesus Green Pool maintain data on water temperatures on their website.

Located alongside the River Cam opposite Chesterton Road between Jesus Lock and Victoria Avenue Bridge, the pool has sunbathing space and is paved on one side with grass on the other. A sauna is available.

A map giving the detailed layout of the lido can be seen on OpenStreetMap.

Despite past attempts to shut it down, it has remained open. In 1997, the pool facilities were upgraded, with new shower and toilet facilities added, although the new design was complained about, due to problems with the architecture and plumbing. The pool still retains most of its original features and remains of interest from a historical point of view. There are separate male and female changing facilities, and domed structures containing showers at either end. Baskets, and room for their storage, are provided for clothes.

There is a much smaller outdoor pool upstream of the city centre at Sheep's Green, and swimming in the Cam remains popular near Grantchester.

In Media

A short film titled "Jesus Green Pool" was produced in 2004 by amateur director Chris Cox. The film emphasizes the seasonal nature of the pool by documenting a single summer at the pool; from opening in the Spring, to closing in the Autumn. It was shown at the Cambridge Film Festival in the summer of 2005.

References

External links
"Jesus Green Pool" film - available to watch online
Facebook page.
Twitter Stream — a Twitter channel to provide live updates of water temperature and weather closures.
 Pool information from Cambridge City Council.
Lidos in the UK
 Friends of Jesus Green Pool
 Rundpool

Lidos
Buildings and structures in Cambridge
Tourist attractions in Cambridge
Swimming venues in England